The University of Azad Jammu and Kashmir  ( Koshur:ژاٹھَلِ آزاد جۄٚم تہٕ کشیٖر) is located in Muzaffarabad, Azad Jammu and Kashmir, Pakistan.

Recognized university 
It was established in 1980, and is currently ranked at No.16 in Higher Education Commission of Pakistan ranking of general category of universities in Pakistan.

Basic Information, Faculties and Departments
It is a multi discipline and multi campus University. The University of Azad Jammu and Kashmir is the biggest educational institution in Azad Jammu and Kashmir. It consists of four faculties i.e., faculty of sciences, faculty of arts, faculty of health sciences and faculty of engineering.
 

Faculty of Sciences

Department of Botany
Department of Zoology
Department of Computer Sciences and Information technology
Department of Biotechnology
Kashmir Institute of Geology

Department of Mathematics
Department of Statistics
Department of Physics
Department of Chemistry

Faculty of Arts

Department of Islamic Studies
Department of Law
Department of Management Sciences
Department of Psychology
Department of Sociology and Rural Development
Department of Urdu Language
Institute of Kashmir Studies
Institute of Languages
Kashmir Institute of Economics

Faculty of Engineering
Department of Electrical Engineering
Department of Software Engineering

Faculty of Medical and Health Sciences

 Department of Public Health Sciences
Department of Allied Health Sciences

References

External links
 

Public universities and colleges in Pakistan
Universities and colleges in Azad Kashmir
Educational institutions established in 1980